National Western Life Insurance Company is an American stock life insurance company headquartered in Austin, Texas.

History 
The company was founded in 1956, and as of 2019 it has about 275 employees and 25,200 contracted independent agents and operates in 49 US states. 

On 1 January 2020, National Western Life Insurance Company (NWLIC) confirmed the formation of The Sterling Group, a strategic partnership between itself and six large regional marketing organizations. Such strategic marketing agencies include Excel Advisors, CreativeOne, Financial Independence Group, Gradient Insurance Brokerage, Impact Partnership and M&O Marketing.

Products 
The company offers individual universal life plans, term insurance plans, and whole life plans as well as offering annuities and life insurance products for foreign nationals.

See also

 American National Insurance Company

References

External links
 National Western Life
 National Western Life 4th-quarter profit rises. Associated Press at Bloomberg Businessweek. March 12, 2010.
 National Western Life's profit dips slightly. Austin Business Journal. Friday November 9, 2007.

1956 establishments in Texas
Financial services companies established in 1956
Companies based in Austin, Texas
Life insurance companies of the United States
Companies listed on the Nasdaq
Insurance companies based in Texas
American companies established in 1956